Farabee may refer to:

People
David Farabee (born 1964), former member of the Texas House of Representatives
Helen J. Farabee (1934-1988), mental health activist
Joel Farabee (born 2000), American professional ice hockey player
Ray Farabee (1932-2014), former member of the Texas State Senate
William Curtis Farabee (1865-1925), physical anthropologist

Places
Farabee, Indiana, an unincorporated community in Washington County